This is a list of notable chocolate drinks. Chocolate is a processed, typically sweetened food produced from the seed of the tropical Theobroma cacao tree. Its earliest documented use is by the Olmecs of south central Mexico around 1100 BC.  The majority of Mesoamerican people made chocolate beverages, including the Maya and Aztecs, who made it into a beverage known as xocolātl , a Nahuatl word meaning "bitter water".

Chocolate drinks

  Akta-Vite
  Banania
  Bicerin
  Bournvita
  Brownie Chocolate Drink
  Cacolac
  Carnation (brand)
  Champurrado
  Choc-Ola
  Chocolate liqueur
  Chocolate milk
  Chocolate Coke
  Chocomel
  Cocio
  Cocodirect
  Cola Cao
  Egg cream
  Espressino
  Hot chocolate
  Kókómjólk
  Marocchino
  Milo (drink)
  Nesquik
  Ovaltine
  Pinolillo
  Pópo
  Pozol
  Pucko
  Stephen's Gourmet
  Submarino
  Swiss Miss
  Tascalate
  Tejate
  Toddy (PepsiCo)
  Tsokolate (or Sikwate)
  Vi-Co
  Yoo-Hoo
  Xicolatada

Chocolate liqueurs
  Chocolate liqueur
  Liqueur Fogg
  Ratafia de cacao
  Sabra liqueur
  Vana Tallinn
  Vermeer Dutch Chocolate Cream Liqueur

Ecuadorian chocolate
 La Universal
 Caoni
 Chocoart
 Ecuartesanal
 Valdivia
 Hoja Verde
 Kallari 
 Pacari
 Incakaw
 Mindo chocolate 
 Conexión
 Villakuyayay

Mexican chocolate
 Abuelita
 Ibarra (chocolate)
 Mayordomo
 Taza Chocolate
 Pópo

See also

 Champorado – sweet chocolate rice porridge in Philippine cuisine.
 Hot chocolate effect – phenomenon of wave mechanics first observed in the making of hot chocolate or instant coffee

References

Lists of drinks
Mexican chocolate